Jason Hazeley and Joel Morris are a British comedy writing duo. Their work includes a collection of parody Ladybird books, and they have written scripts for many British comedy series and films, including That Mitchell and Webb Look, Charlie Brooker's Screenwipe and the Paddington films.

Early lives
Hazeley (then known as Jason Smith) and Morris met at King Edward VI Grammar School in Chelmsford, Essex. Whilst at school they produced a parody newsletter, and at sixth form received their first paid work after selling a joke to the Russ Abbott show.

Career

Television and film
Hazeley and Morris have written for a number of British TV shows and films. These include That Mitchell and Webb Look, A Touch of Cloth, Charlie Brooker's Screenwipe, Electionwipe and Newswipe programmes, and several Philomena Cunk series. The pair are regular contributors to the British adult comic Viz. The 2016 Electionwipe won the BAFTA award for best Comedy and entertainment programme.

The pair also wrote for Paddington and Paddington 2.

Books
Hazeley and Morris have co-written books including Bollocks to Alton Towers, and a series of parody Ladybird books which re-caption original illustrations from the Ladybird series with jokes aimed at an adult audience. Topics have included Donald Trump, hipsters and hangovers and Brexit. The books were so successful that in 2015 only JK Rowling, David Walliams and Julia Donaldson sold more copies in the UK.

In October 2015, it was announced that Morris had co-written a series of Ladybird books for adults with Jason Hazeley. The books, which parody the style of the company's classic books for children, re-caption original illustrations from the Ladybird series with new text, offering sardonic commentary on many areas of modern life. The initial run included titles such as The Hangover, Mindfulness, Dating and The Hipster and were published on 18 November 2015. The series was later expanded to include public figures such as Donald Trump.

The pair were writers on The Framley Examiner, a local news parody website which later became a book, with Robin Halstead and Alex Morris.

Podcast
Hazeley and Morris hosted the comedy podcast Rule of Three until 2020.
Rule of Three was named in the best podcasts of 2018 by The Guardian. On the show they invite a comedy performer on to discuss their career and a comedy performance or programme, a TV show, a film, a book, an album or a comic that means a lot to them. Guests have included Eddie Izzard, John Finnemore, Danielle Ward, Jon Holmes, and Aisling Bea Topics have included Bill Hicks, films such as Trading Places and Time Bandits, and the LP version of The Album of the Soundtrack of the Trailer of the Film of Monty Python and the Holy Grail. The podcast has branched out into live shows with special guests such as Sue Perkins. Hazeley has also appeared as a guest on the Griefcast podcast with Cariad Lloyd. At the 2020 British Podcast Awards it was named best Arts and Culture Podcast.

Music
From 1998 to 2003 Hazeley was part of the folk-pop duo Ben & Jason.

Morris is lead singer in the band Candidate who released their fourth album in 2004. His harmonies with his brother were compared in The Guardian to Simon and Garfunkel.

Publications

References

British comedy writers
British male singers
Living people
Year of birth missing (living people)
British comedy duos
Screenwriting duos